Timothy Knapp House and Milton Cemetery is a historic district at 265 Rye Beach Avenue and Milton Road in Rye, New York.

The earliest part of the Timothy Knapp House was built around 1670, and the site was added to the National Register of Historic Places in 1982.

The Timothy Knapp House is considered the oldest residential property in Westchester County, New York, having been built in the 1660s.  The property has been owned by only 5 families between 1663 and 1992, when it was acquired by the Rye Historical Society. The Milton Cemetery, across the Street from the Knapp House, is Rye's first public burying ground. The house, surrounding gardens and adjacent Milton Cemetery are listed on the National Register of Historic Places.

History

Thomas Studwell, one of the original settlers of the village of Rye, New York built a house on the Rye Beach Ave. property in 1663. At the time, the town of Rye was part of Connecticut. He traded houses with Timothy Knapp of Stamford, CT, who then built the foundations of the current structure as a two-room residence between 1667 and 1670. Knapp was the deputy to the General Court in Hartford, Connecticut, as a Town Constable and Tax Collector. He was also a vestryman of Grace Church in Rye.

Ezekiel Halsted, a wealthy landowner originally from Long Island, purchased the property from Timothy Knapp's sons in 1746. He expanded the house, adding a second floor using "post-and-beam" construction with a sloping roof in the back containing a dining room and kitchen, which gave the house the distinctive saltbox architecture. Beams are hand-hewn, and some retain their original bark.  The house has cellar walls reinforced with lime made from crushed oyster shells, 12-inch wooden nails holding floorboards together and a massive center chimney reinforced with mud mortar. The Halsted family lived in the house for the next 157 years.

In 1906, Simeon Ford, co-owner of the Grand Union Hotel in Manhattan and a real estate developer, purchased the Knapp House. Julia Lauren Ford, his daughter, was an internationally known religious artist whose work is included in the collections of the Metropolitan Museum, the Art Institute of Chicago and the Corcoran Gallery in Washington. Miss Ford was responsible for all three 20th-century additions to the house, including a studio, a greenhouse and an aviary. Lauren was also helped in the founding of the Benedictine Abbey of Regina Laudis in Connecticut, which became the basis for the film Come to the Stable, written by Clare Boothe Luce.

Before moving to Connecticut in 1940, Ms. Ford rented the house to the Matthew Taylors, whose descendants purchased it in 1969 and owned the property until it was sold to the Rye Historical Society in 1992 for $320,000.

Milton Cemetery

The Milton Cemetery is a one-acre public burying ground originally part of the Knapp estate, located on the west side of Milton Street across from the Knapp House. The oldest tombstone is that of Nehemiah Webb who was buried in 1722. It is now owned and maintained by the City of Rye and no longer in use.

Archives and gardens
The Timothy Knapp House contains the Rye Historical Society Archives, including about 15,000 documents, maps, pictures, books and pamphlets. The Kay Donahue Memorial Garden is a historic kitchen/herb garden with authentic plantings maintained by the Little Garden Club.

Preservation and landmark status
The House and Cemetery were placed on the National Register of Historic Places in 1982.

The Rye Historical Society purchased the Knapp House in 1992, while the Cemetery was deeded to the City of Rye.

See also

 List of the oldest buildings in New York
 National Register of Historic Places listings in southern Westchester County, New York
 Rye (city), New York

External links
 Rye Historical Society website

References

Cemeteries on the National Register of Historic Places in New York (state)
Historic districts on the National Register of Historic Places in New York (state)
Houses on the National Register of Historic Places in New York (state)
National Register of Historic Places in Westchester County, New York
Houses completed in 1670
Houses in Westchester County, New York
Cemeteries in Westchester County, New York
Buildings and structures in Rye, New York
1670 establishments in the Province of New York